Oncorhynchus masou formosanus,  the Formosan landlocked salmon or Taiwanese salmon, is a  freshwater salmonid fish endemic to Taiwan.

Population 

The Formosan landlocked salmon is a subspecies of the more widespread West-Pacific cherry salmon (or masu salmon). This Taiwanese subspecies is critically endangered, being at high risk for extinction, and is protected in its native habitat. The Formosan land-locked salmon is one of the rarest fish in the world. Overfishing has led to its decline. Conservationists are trying to save this subspecies which is threatened nowadays mainly by pollution. By 1992, there were only 200 remaining according to official count. Over the next 20 years, the Taiwanese government, the Shei-Pa National Park Administration, as well as effective conservation efforts in Taiwan, restored the fish population to historical high of 12,587 in 2020. In March 2023, the number of fish once again reached new heights since restoration first started in 1995, with 15,374 counted by the Shei-Pa National Park Administration.

Description 
Formosan landlocked salmon are about a foot in length and inhabit cold, slow-flowing streams with gently sloping beds at elevations above , such as the Chichiawan Stream and the Kaoshan Stream (formerly named Hsuehshan Stream/Wuling Stream) in the upper reaches of the Tachia River, within the ranges of Shei-Pa National Park. 

At this time, these salmon represent the southernmost natural distribution of members of the family Salmonidae in Asia.

Taxonomy 
The taxonomic rank of the endemic Taiwanese salmon is in dispute.  Some authors consider it not distinct from the nominate cherry salmon (O. masou masou), others as a regional subspecies O. masou formosanus, and still others list is as a full species O. formosanus.

Popular culture 
The salmon is featured on the Taiwanese 2,000 dollar bill.

See also
 List of protected species in Taiwan
 List of endemic species of Taiwan

Notes

References
 

Oncorhynchus
Endemic fauna of Taiwan
Taxa named by David Starr Jordan
Taxa named by Masamitsu Ōshima
Freshwater fish of Taiwan
Critically endangered fish
Critically endangered fauna of Asia
Fish of East Asia
Taxonomy articles created by Polbot
Subspecies
Fish described in 1919